Pareuxoa parajanae is a moth of the family Noctuidae. It is found in the Magallanes and Antartica Chilena Region of Chile.

The wingspan is about 26 mm. Adults are on wing in February.

External links
 Noctuinae of Chile

Noctuinae
Endemic fauna of Chile